"Needles and Pins" is a rock song credited to American writers Jack Nitzsche and Sonny Bono. Jackie DeShannon recorded it in 1963 and other versions followed. The most successful ones were by the Searchers, whose version reached No. 1 on the UK singles chart in 1964, and Smokie, who had a worldwide hit in 1977. Others who recorded the song include the Ramones, Gene Clark, and Tom Petty and the Heartbreakers with Stevie Nicks.

Jackie DeShannon version (1963)
In his autobiography, Bono states that he sang along with Nitzsche's guitar-playing, thus creating both the tune and the lyrics, being guided by the chord progressions. However, Jackie DeShannon claims that the song was written at the piano, and that she was a full participant in the song's creation, along with Nitzsche and Bono, although she did not get formal credit.

DeShannon was the first to record the song; in the US it peaked at number 84 on the Billboard Hot 100 singles chart in May 1963. Though it was only a minor US hit, DeShannon's recording of the song topped the charts in Canada, hitting number one on the CHUM Chart in July 1963.

The Searchers version (1964)

The Searchers heard British performer Cliff Bennett perform "Needles and Pins" at the Star-Club in Hamburg, Germany, instantly wanted it to be their next single and recorded it before Cliff Bennett could.  The Pye Records single was released in January 1964. It was number one in the United Kingdom, Ireland and South Africa and peaked at number 13 on the Billboard Hot 100 singles chart in the United States.  Soon after, in April 1964, "Needles and Pins" appeared on the Searchers' next album, It's the Searchers.

Audible during the Searchers' recording of "Needles and Pins" is a faulty bass drum pedal, which squeaks throughout the song.  It is particularly noticeable during the opening of the number.

Part of the Searchers' version can be heard as the intro of the song "Use the Man" from Megadeth's Cryptic Writings album, although it does not appear on the remastered version.

A German version sung by the Searchers is called "Tausend Nadelstiche".

Charts

Smokie version (1977)

In 1977, at the height of their popularity, English rock band Smokie recorded the song as a rock ballad for the album Bright Lights & Back Alleys, and got a European and an Australian hit with "Needles and Pins". The song reached number one in Austria. Later, ex-Smokie vocalist Chris Norman included his solo cover of the song on his studio album Full Circle (2000).

Charts

Weekly charts

Year-end charts

Ramones version (1978)
The Ramones included "Needles and Pins" on their 1978 album Road to Ruin.  Their version was also included on the band's first greatest hits collection, Ramones Mania.

In turn, pop-punk band The Commercials recorded the song for the tribute album Ramones Maniacs.

Tom Petty and the Heartbreakers version (1985; live)

Tom Petty and the Heartbreakers released their first live album in 1985 called Pack Up the Plantation: Live! where singer-songwriter and Fleetwood Mac vocalist Stevie Nicks performed on "Needles and Pins" with Tom Petty at the Forum in Los Angeles, California in June of 1981.

Cash Box said that "a great song is given a great treatment."

Willie DeVille version (1999)
Willie DeVille recorded "Needles and Pins" for his 1999 album Horse Of A Different Colour.

References

1963 singles
1964 singles
Jackie DeShannon songs
Jangle pop songs
Ramones songs
Tom Petty songs
The Searchers (band) songs
UK Singles Chart number-one singles
Irish Singles Chart number-one singles
RPM Top Singles number-one singles
Number-one singles in South Africa
Songs written by Sonny Bono
Liberty Records singles
Pye Records singles
MCA Records singles
RAK Records singles
Cher songs
1963 songs
Songs written by Jack Nitzsche
Song recordings produced by Ed Stasium
Song recordings produced by Mike Chapman
Song recordings produced by Tony Hatch
Song recordings produced by Tommy Ramone
Stevie Nicks songs
Song recordings produced by Dick Glasser
Song recordings with Wall of Sound arrangements